The 2012–13 Liga Alef season saw Hapoel Afula (champions of the North Division) and Hapoel Katamon (champions of the South Division) win the title and promotion to Liga Leumit. Beitar Kfar Saba won the promotion play-offs and met Beitar Tel Aviv Ramla of Liga Leumit and lost 2–4 on aggregate and thus remained in Liga Alef.

At the bottom, the bottom two clubs in each division, Hapoel Kafr Kanna, Maccabi Sektzia Ma'alot-Tarshiha (from North division), Maccabi Ironi Kfar Yona and Ortodoxim Lod were all automatically relegated to Liga Bet, whilst the two clubs which were ranked in 14th place in each division, Maccabi Kafr Kanna and Hapoel Arad entered a promotion/relegation play-offs, Maccabi Kafr Kanna prevailing to stay in Liga Alef, while Hapoel Arad were relegated after losing the play-offs.

Changes from last season

Format changes
 The divisions reverted to being played under the same rules as 2010–11 Liga Alef, with the champions of each division winning promotion, the clubs ranked 2nd to 5th entering promotion play-offs, the clubs ranked 14th entering relegation play-offs and the bottom two clubs relegating automatically to Liga Bet.

Team changes
 Maccabi Yavne were promoted to Liga Leumit; Hapoel Herzliya (to North division), Maccabi Be'er Sheva and Maccabi Ironi Bat Yam (to South division) were relegated from Liga Leumit.
 Maccabi Ironi Jatt withdrew from the league mid-season and folded.
 Maccabi Tamra, and Ahi Acre were relegated to Liga Bet from North division; Hapoel Migdal HaEmek was promoted to the North division from Liga Bet.
 Maccabi Netivot and Maccabi HaShikma Ramat Hen were relegated to Liga Bet from South division; Hapoel Azor and Maccabi Sha'arayim were promoted to the South division from Liga Bet.

North Division

South Division

Promotion play-offs

First round
Second and third placed clubs played single match at home against the fourth and fifth placed clubs in their respective regional division.

Hapoel Migdal HaEmek and Hapoel Herzliya (from North division) and Hapoel Azor and Beitar Kfar Saba (from South division) advanced to the second round.

Second round
The winners of the first round played single match at home of the higher ranked club (from each regional division).

Hapoel Migdal HaEmek and Beitar Kfar Saba advanced to the third round.

Third round
Hapoel Migdal HaEmek and Beitar Kfar Saba faced each other for a single match in neutral venue. the winner advanced to the fourth round against the 14th placed club in Liga Leumit.

Beitar Kfar Saba advanced to the fourth round.

Fourth round
Beitar Kfar Saba faced the 14th placed in 2012–13 Liga Leumit Beitar Tel Aviv Ramla. the winner on aggregate earned a spot in the 2013–14 Liga Leumit. The matches took place on May 24 and 28, 2013.

Beitar Tel Aviv Ramla won 4–2 on aggregate and remained in Liga Leumit. Beitar Kfar Saba remained in Liga Alef.

Relegation play-offs

North play-off
The 14th placed club in Liga Alef North, Maccabi Kafr Kanna, faced the Liga Bet play-offs winner, Hapoel Iksal. the winner earned a spot in the 2013–14 Liga Alef.

Maccabi Kafr Kanna remained in Liga Alef.

South play-off
The 14th placed club in Liga Alef South, Hapoel Arad, faced the Liga Bet play-offs winner, F.C. Kafr Qasim. the winner earned a spot in the 2013–14 Liga Alef.

Hapoel Arad relegated to Liga Bet.

References
Liga Alef North 2012/2013 The Israel Football Association 
Liga Alef South 2012/2013 The Israel Football Association 

Liga Alef seasons
3
Israel